Soundscape Digital Technology developed Windows-based digital audio workstations for multi-channel studio recording, editing and mastering.

Soundscape SSHDR1 
Soundscape was formed in the UK when in early 1992, Chris Wright, the head designer and Technical Manager for Cheetah Marketing Ltd., with Belgian designer Johan Bonnaerens and Cheetah, together with Johan's employer Sydec NV agreed a plan to jointly design, manufacture and market a modular 4 track hard disk based digital audio workstation (DAW).

The SSHDR1 DAW became, if not the first, certainly one of the first products of this kind available and was showcased as an 8 track system at the NAMM and Musik Messe trade shows in 1993. Cheetah's parent company Cannon Street Investments was struggling during the UK recession and closed the company in March 1993, splitting off the computer peripherals division (which principally manufactured joysticks such as Bart Simpson, Batman and Alien licensed designs) to another company in the group. Chris Wright along with Sales Manager Nick Owen bought the assets of the Cheetah music products division, forming Soundscape Digital Technology Ltd., immediately took on two of the ex-Cheetah employees (Marcus Case - Production Manager and Kirstie Davies - Operations Manager) and started to market and manufacture the Soundscape SSHDR1, shipping the first batch of 100 units in August 1993.

Like Chris, who had started designing products for music (synthesizers, effects, samplers, keyboards, drum machines) in his spare time (his day job was as a Senior Electronics Designer in telecoms), Johan was also an avid rock guitar player and music fan and had started the design at home. A long experienced audio designer himself, Chris contributed in some of the key elements of the DSP (Digital Signal Processing) code such as how to efficiently implement real-time fade curves, and digital compressors and chase locking to timecode, and his experience of EMC shielding and testing techniques enabled rapid EMC approval to be gained. He later concentrated on developing the specifications for the Soundscape products as they moved into the demanding high end markets in broadcast and film sound. Johan concentrated mainly on the Windows software and another engineer took over the DSP code.

The system rapidly gained market success, shipping over 700 systems in the first year and garnered excellent reviews throughout the music and recording press in Europe, Australia and the US, and featured on the front page of most major magazines. The system was renowned for its bulletproof stability, something that was the holy grail of computer based recording on PCs. This was due to its split design with separate Motorola 56000 DSP powered hardware that was controlled by Windows editing software. The hardware took the strain allowing a very light demand on the PC, so that other MIDI sequencers such as eMagic Logic, Steinberg Cubase, Cakewalk and others could be used simultaneously. The boast was that even if the PC crashed, the system would continue recording, and this was demonstrated regularly. The result was that while most other computer based recording/editing systems were all studio based, Soundscape could also be used for live recording and could be relied upon for recording 100 piece orchestras with no risk. Integration of the SSHDR1 hardware within eMagic Logic Audio and Cakewalk was developed by both companies using the Soundscape API.

Design elements 
The modular nature and expandability to 16 units connected to one PC was also somewhat unusual. Initially launched as a 4 track 16bit, 48 kHz system and using inexpensive IDE drives (the first units shipped with 2 x 120MB drives), advances in the efficiency of the DSP code extended this first to 8 tracks with 24bit recording and then with the addition of a second DSP board, to 12 tracks and also added the world's first configurable DSP based digital mixer. Huge systems could be configured as just 8 units coupled together formed a 96 track system with sample accurate synchronisation and could be controlled from one editing screen. The unit also had removable drive trays fitted as it had become cost efficient to simply put drives on the shelf as they cost far less per hour of audio than master tape.

Soundscape also produced a range of modular audio interface units that connected to the Soundscape SSHDR1 unit via TDIF.

Soundscape took a bold decision to offer free of charge software updates to their users, a decision that generated user loyalty of a level previously unknown for computer based audio products. Added to that, the quality of the product release remained incredibly high and bugs were virtually non-existent.

Soundscape R.Ed, Mixtreme and Mixpander cards 
In 1997 the Soundscape R.Ed system was released which offered 32 tracks per units at up to 24bit 96 kHz and had two removable and two fixed drive bays. IDE disks, which at first had been ridiculed by many as non-professional, nevertheless had dominated the PC market and were approximately half the price of SCSI. The system could now contain a massive amount of inexpensive storage and was as reliable as ever. The limitation of the system compared to the market leader Pro Tools, had always been the amount of DSP power available for mixing and effects, but in 2000, this was removed with the launch of the Mixpander card, which added 9 of the latest super powerful Motorola 563xx DSPs to the system, connected via a fast bus, and so finally a vast amount of real-time DSP processing power was available.

From 1993 to 2000 approximately 10,000 Soundscape systems were shipped and were being used in many professional applications as well as in home studios. Several successful Hollywood produced TV  shows such as Mad About You and Frasier were almost completely edited using Soundscape, systems were in use in large numbers throughout the CBC in Canada and other broadcasters in many countries, large multitrack systems in recording studios. Soundscape had introduced an entire recording generation to digital recording and editing many of whom had previously never even used a computer. This system was very simple to use but contained powerful editing tools, real-time plug-in effects and had wide-ranging support throughout the industry with Soundscape format plug-ins developed by many top companies such as TC Electronics, Dolby, Drawmer, CEDAR Audio Ltd, Synchro Arts etc. Also there were some 30 to 40 companies developing or including Soundscape hardware in their products, from radio automation companies such as RCS, D.A.V.I.D and Dalet Digital Media Systems to video NLE manufacturers such as DPS and D-Vision (later Discreet) and many others who used Soundscape Mixtreme cards and Soundscape iBox audio  interfaces.

The Mixtreme card, first shipped in 1998 was Soundscape's first PCI card and utilised the DSP mixer developed for the Soundscape SSHDR1 so that along with 16 channels of I/O, it could also support the full range of Soundscape format real-time DSP effects plug-ins available. This was a unique card and the first of its type. Over the next few years many thousands of cards were shipped and it gained wide recognition as a very flexible and future proof audio solution.

Demise 
In 1997 Sydec had started to run into hard times, as following a management buyout from their parent company Niko (a Belgian manufacturer of electrical products such as light fittings), the managing director had become ill, they had a dispute with their former owners and the result was that 50% of the expected income disappeared virtually overnight. The Soundscape side of Sydec's business, which by now had risen to approximately 10 people, half of the company, was still doing well, but without income from the other half, Sydec needed extra revenue badly. Chris Wright started to develop ideas to port the DSP core of the Soundscape R.Ed as a stand-alone recorder engine and began to discuss this with his contacts at Tascam in Japan.

A plan was formed to provide a 24 track recorder plug-in board for Tascam digital mixers, but at the end Tascam didn't sign the contract as they had received a better offer from one of their existing 3rd party developers (in end the product never appeared). Chris Wright then presented the same idea to Mackie (which at the time was a $300 million NASDAQ listed corporation) and an agreement was made to produce a stand-alone 24 track recorder, that eventually became the Mackie SDR2496. Mackie held off on signing the contract, as their investigations into Sydec's heath had shown that the company was vulnerable and eventually made an offer to buy the shares of Sydec which was accepted.  Mackie announced to the world's music industry that they had bought Soundscape at the NAMM show in 2001, which wasn't correct, and in doing so infringed the images, logos copyright owned by Soundscape Digital Technology Ltd. Soundscape's distribution network and customers became extremely nervous and business stalled, just as the long-awaited Mixpander was being launched. Soundscape disputed Mackie's use of their intellectual property and a legal action ensued ending in the High Court in London.

An agreement was struck in May 2003 whereby Soundscape could resume its business without interference from Mackie, but following 5 months with no sales, a large legal bill and the slow summer months ahead, from being in a healthy position at the end of 2000, Soundscape now found itself in difficulties and decided to close its doors in September 2001. Chris Wright joined Teac and Nick Owen started a video dealer based in Cardiff, Wales.

The sales completely halted as the Soundscape distribution network suddenly had no access to the product and the deep knowledge and energy of the Soundscape team that had driven the product to success had disappeared. Far from being the saviour, Mackie was unable to handle the product and for 1 year there was very little activity and almost no sales. In 2002 the Soundscape R.Ed was rebadged as the Mackie Soundscape 32 and re-launched, but the product was by then based on a design that had been conceived over 10 years earlier and the hardware design for the Soundscape R.Ed was originally started in 1995. Times had moved on and more powerful or native processing products (using the CPU of the PC) had become available such as Nuendo, Pyramix and Pro Tools LE and these were much less expensive. Since 2001, Pyramix particularly had begun to fill the void vacated by Soundscape. Mackie was also haemorrhaging cash in many areas and in 2003 suddenly closed Sydec's doors.

Having picked themselves off the floor, Sydec's MD together with Johan Bonnaerens and 3 others reformed as Sydec Audio Engineering and made a deal with Mackie to sell off the stock of Mackie built units. The incredibly loyal Soundscape user base was relieved as they had become very disillusioned with Mackie, but it was difficult to make headway with such a small team. The company continued without great success until 2006, when they were purchased by Solid State Logic.

The company continues to develop and release new software. The hardware department now focusses more on Audio Acquisition and Format Converters (such as their iBox range). As of 2010, the Soundscape 32 system and iBox range was still available. One problem is that IDE disk drives have largely been replaced by SATA and the Soundscape 32 units cannot support them. The current focus is to utilise hard disks connected to the PC together with a Mixpander card, providing a way that the software can operate without relying on the external units. The latest range has focussed on MADI connections, but this is a relatively niche area.

History 
1992 Cheetah Marketing agrees deal with Sydec NV
1993 Soundscape Digital Technology Ltd. formed after Cheetah's closure
1993 Soundscape SSHDR1 launched
1994 Over 700 Soundscape SSHDR1 systems sold
1995 Soundscape iBox range of Audio Interfaces launched
1997 Soundscape R.Ed launched
1998 Soundscape Mixtreme PCI card launched
2000 Soundscape Mixpander DSP card launched
2001 Sydec NV bought by Mackie, 
2001 Soundscape Digital Technology in legal dispute with Mackie, the company closes its doors in September
2003 Mackie closes Sydec in April
2003 Sydec reopens in August as Sydec Audio Engineering NV
2006 Sydec bought by SSL
2012 Most Sydec's developers are leaving the company

External links 

 Sydec Audio Engineering NV

Manufacturers of professional audio equipment
Digital audio workstation software
Audio equipment manufacturers of the United Kingdom